Glasgow Industrial Airport  is a private airport located 14 nautical miles (16 miles or 26 km) northeast of the central business district of Glasgow, a city in Valley County, Montana, United States.

The airport is located on the site of the former Glasgow Air Force Base which was in operation from 1957 to 1968, then again from 1972 to 1976.

The Boeing Company operates a Flight Test Facility at this airport, which is maintained and operated by the Montana Aviation Research Company (MARCO), a Boeing subsidiary.

Facilities 
It has one runway designated 11/29 with a 13,500 ft by 300 ft (4,115 m x 91 m) concrete surface.

References

External links 

Airports in Montana
Buildings and structures in Valley County, Montana
Transportation in Valley County, Montana
Boeing